The Air Force Medical Operations Agency (AFMOA), Port San Antonio, Texas (Lackland Annex), oversees execution of the Air Force Surgeon General policies supporting Air Force expeditionary capabilities, healthcare operations, and national security strategy. It provides expert consultative leadership support to 75 military treatment facilities and eleven major commands/direct reporting units to ensure cost-effective, modern, and prevention-based healthcare continuum for 2.1 million beneficiaries worldwide. The AFMOA directs and supports the clinical currency of 43,131 healthcare professionals providing 6.6 million visits and 133,500 bed days. The agency provides clinical and population health data and analysis to AF/SG and MAJCOM surgeons. The agency partners with the Assistant Secretary of Defense (Health Affairs), Secretary of the Air Force, Chief of Staff of the Air Force, and the Department of Veterans Affairs.

History 
The Air Force Medical Operations Agency sprang from the ashes of the former flight medicine department of the Air Force Medical Service (AFMS) in 1992. Though it originally cared for operational matters under the direction of the AF/SG (Surgeon General) as a field-operating unit, as AFMS duties changed, so did those of the AFMOA. The AFMS moved to more of a proactive approach, managing population health rather than episodic care to improve the health and lives of Air Force members and their families. This in turn led to an increase in AFMOA responsibilities; the Agency expanded to optimizing medical resources, radiation protection, aerospace medicine, and clinical excellence, among other interests.

AFMOA was inactivated on June 28, 2019 alongside the Air Force Medical Support Agency, and their functions were consolidated into the new Air Force Medical Readiness Agency.

Products and Customers

AF/SG 
Implement SG policy, provide expertise needed for policy development, and precise application of resources to requirements

MAJCOM/SGs 
Support MAJCOM Surgeons by addressing healthcare resourcing and operations issues pertinent to their missions

MTF/CCs 
Provide resources, coordinate best processes, data analysis, and clinical expertise for efficient patient-centered healthcare

Air Force Medical Service Logo - "Air Force Medicine: Trusted Care... Anywhere"

References

Notes

Bibliography

 Air Force Historical Research Agency AFMOA Page

See also
Air Force Medical Service - AFMOA Homepage

Medical Operations Agency
Military in Texas